Mount Garan is a mountain marked by a cluster of small peaks, rising  southwest of Mount Strathcona near the head of Denman Glacier in Antarctica. It was mapped from aerial photographs taken by U.S. Navy Operation Highjump, 1946–47, and was named by the Advisory Committee on Antarctic Names for E.M. Garan, aerial photographer on Operation Highjump flights over this and other coastal areas.

References

Mountains of Queen Mary Land